Dr William Smith Syme FRSE (1870–1928) was a Newfoundland-born surgeon who came to fame in Scotland.

Life
He was born in Newfoundland in 1870 (then a colony of Britain, from 1933 part of Canada). He was sent to Edinburgh in Scotland in 1887 to study Medicine and graduated MB ChB in 1891. After graduation he worked briefly in Crewe then moved to Gamlingay in Cambridgeshire. He received his doctorate (MD) in 1898.

In 1903 he moved to Glasgow, living at 3 Northbank Terrace in the Kelvinside district. Here he was a surgeon at Glasgow's Ear Nose and Throat Hospital, also consulting to the Royal Hospital for Sick Children. Soon after arrival he founded the Scottish Otological and Laryngological Society.

He was President of the Ruskin Society of Glasgow.

In 1912 he was elected a Fellow of the Royal Society of Edinburgh. His proposers were Thomas Hastie Bryce, Arthur Logan Turner, Ralph Stockman and Robert Jardine.

In 1922 he was living at 1 Lynedoch Crescent in north-west Glasgow.

He died on 14 August 1928 whilst on holiday in Abersoch in North Wales.

Family
His son William Smith Syme Jr followed his career fairly exactly and the two are often confused. William Jr won the Military Cross in the First World War.

Publications
Handbook of Diseases of Nose Throat and Ear (1920)

References

1870 births
1928 deaths
Alumni of the University of Edinburgh
Fellows of the Royal Society of Edinburgh